Corrosella is a genus of minute freshwater snails with an operculum, aquatic gastropod molluscs or micromolluscs in the subfamily Pseudamnicolinae of the family Hydrobiidae.

Species
 Corrosella andalusica (Delicado, Machordom & Ramos, 2012)
 Corrosella astierii (Dupuy, 1851)
 Corrosella atlasensis Boulaassafer, Ghamizi & Delicado, 2021
 Corrosella bareai  (Delicado, Machordom & Ramos, 2012)
 Corrosella collingi (Boeters, Girardi & Knebelsberger, 2015)
 Corrosella falkneri Boeters, 1970
 Corrosella herreroi (Bech, 1993)
 Corrosella hinzi (Boeters, 1986)
 Corrosella hydrobiopsis (Boeters, 1999)
 Corrosella iruritai  (Delicado, Machordom & Ramos, 2012)
 Corrosella luisi (Boeters, 1984)
 Corrosella mahouchii Boulaassafer, Ghamizi & Delicado, 2021
 Corrosella manueli  (Delicado, Machordom & Ramos, 2012)
 Corrosella marisolae  (Delicado, Machordom & Ramos, 2012)
 Corrosella marocana (Pallary, 1922)
 Corrosella navasiana (Fagot, 1907)
 Corrosella nechadae Boulaassafer, Ghamizi & Delicado, 2021
 Corrosella pallaryi (Ghamizi, Vala & Bouka, 1997)
 Corrosella segoviana (Talaván Serna & Talaván Gómez, 2019)
 Corrosella tajoensis  (Boeters, Girardi & Knebelsberger, 2015)
 Corrosella tejedoi  (Boeters, Girardi & Knebelsberger, 2015)
 Corrosella valladolensis  (Boeters, Girardi & Knebelsberger, 2015)
 Corrosella wakrimi Boulaassafer, Ghamizi & Delicado, 2021
Synonyms
 Corrosella anteisensis (Bérenguier, 1882): synonym of Corrosella astierii (Dupuy, 1851)
 Corrosella hauffei (Delicado & Ramos, 2012): synonym of Corrosella herreroi (Bech, 1993)

References

 Boeters, H. D. (1970). Corrosella n. gen. [Westeuropäische Hydrobiidae, 3] (Prosobranchia, Hydrobiidae]. Journal de Conchyliologie. 108: 63-69

External links
 Delicado D., Machordom A. & Ramos M.A. (2015). Effects of habitat transition on the evolutionary patterns of the microgastropod genus Pseudamnicola (Mollusca, Hydrobiidae). Zoologica Scripta. 44(4): 403-417

Hydrobiidae